A camptown, in the country of Lesotho, refers to a district capital for one of the ten districts of Lesotho. The largest camptown is the city of Maseru in Maseru District. Camptowns are usually commerce hubs for the district and are the location for the central government offices for the district. Camptowns usually take the same name as the district in which they are located. For example, as mentioned the camptown for Maseru is Maseru but also the camptown for Thaba-Tseka District is Thaba-Tseka. The exceptions to this rule are Berea District whose capital is called Teyateyaneng, Quthing District whose capital is called Moyeni and Leribe District whose capital is most often called Hlotse.

It presumably derives from the 19th century police camps, then (now archaic) in Sesotho likampo. Official colonial government terminology was government reserve, which prosaically became urban area post-independence.

Subdivisions of Lesotho
Types of administrative division